Lamen Bay Airport  is an airport in Lamen Bay on Epi, Vanuatu.

Airlines and destinations

References

Airports in Vanuatu
Shefa Province